Hanabari (The Haunted House) [ Bengali: হানাবাড়ী ] is a Bengali black and white thriller film released in 1952. Story, screenplay and direction were done by Bengali writer Premendra Mitra. The music director was Pabitra Chattapadhyaya. This movie was produced by Fakhrul Islam Khan in the banner of Mitrani Limited.

Synopsis 
A young man named Jayanta runs away from a haunted house and takes shelter in a nearby home. This is the house of Shrimanta, an artist. Jayanta tells the artist that he had been driving until his car broke down. He entered a house on Diamond Harbour Road, Kolkata where he faced a horrible creature that tried to kill him. Together, the two men go to the police station. The police inspector informs them that they are aware of the mystery. After that, a man bought the house and lives there with his nieces, Lalita and Namita. Jayanta knows the family personally and had a relationship with Lalita when they were in Burma.

He started an investigation and went to the House broker agency 'Bag and Nag' to know the history of the house. He decided to stay there for the security of the family and to solve the mystery. Surprisingly, a beggar moves around the house every day.

One night Jayanta, Shrimanta and the police find the ghostly creature and fire at it to no effect. The matter becomes more complicated when a piece of paper is discovered by Lalita's uncle that appears to be a clue to a hidden treasure. Jayanta suspects that Shrimanta is related to the matter. In the meantime, someone tries to kill Lalita's uncle and the police arrest Jayanta. Finally, it is revealed that all murder and ghostly atmosphere created by the real culprit for the treasure.

Cast 
 Dhiraj Bhattacharya as Detective alias beggar 
 Nabadwip Haldar as Mr Nag
 Goutam Mukhopadhyay as Jayanta Chowdhury
 Shyam Laha as Mr Bag
 Bipul Mukherjee as Srimanta Sarkar
 Pranati Ghosh as Lolita

References

External links
 

1952 films
Bengali-language Indian films
Indian detective films
Indian crime thriller films
1950s crime thriller films
Films directed by Premendra Mitra
Films based on Indian novels
1950s Bengali-language films
Indian black-and-white films